The American Journal of Physiology is a peer-reviewed scientific journal on physiology published by the American Physiological Society.

Vols. for 1898–1941 and 1948-56 include the Society's proceedings, including abstracts of papers presented at the 10th-53rd annual meetings, and the 1948-56 fall meetings.

Subjournals 
The American Journal of Physiology has seven subjournals; according to the 2019 Journal Citation Reports their impact factors vary from 2.992 to 4.406:

 AJP-Cell Physiology
 AJP-Endocrinology and Metabolism
 AJP-Gastrointestinal and Liver Physiology
 AJP-Heart and Circulatory Physiology
 AJP-Lung Cellular and Molecular Physiology
 AJP-Regulatory, Integrative and Comparative Physiology
 AJP-Renal Physiology

References

External links 
 

Monthly journals
English-language journals
Publications established in 1898
Physiology journals